Mary "May" Cluskey (18 May 1927–15 May 1991) was an Irish stage, film and television actress.

Early life 
Mary Elizabeth Cluskey was born in Dublin, Ireland, the daughter of Francis Cluskey and Elizabeth Millington Cluskey. Her brother Frank Cluskey was a politician, leader of the Labour Party from 1977 to 1981.

Career 
Cluskey was a member of the Abbey Theatre in Dublin from 1972 to 1986. Writer Thomas Kilroy remembered her as "an extraordinary comic actress". Among her roles at the Abbey were roles in The Silver Tassie (1972, 1973), The Stars Turn Red (1978) and Red Roses for Me (1980) by Seán O'Casey, Hatchet (1972) and Red Biddy (1978) by Heno Magee, Pull Down a Horseman (1972) by Eugene McCabe, They Feed Christians To Lions Here, Don't They? (1972) by Francis Harvey, The Gathering (1974) and A Pagan Place (1977) by Edna O'Brien, Katie Roche (1975) by Teresa Deevy, Faustus Kelly (1978), At Swim-Two-Birds (1981) and The Hard Life (1986) by Flann O'Brien, The Hostage (1981) by Brendan Behan, and in works by Oscar Wilde, Richard B. Sheridan, Oliver Goldsmith, Dion Boucicault, Henrik Ibsen, Arthur Miller, Anton Chekhov, W. B. Yeats, George S. Kaufman, John Millington Synge, and Bertolt Brecht.

Although Cluskey usually played supporting roles, often mothers, she played the title character in James Ballantyne's Sarah (1974). In 1976, she performed her one-woman show at the Gorey Arts Festival. In 1982, she toured in Frank McGuinness's The Factory Girls. She also wrote two plays, Mothers (1976, with Tomás Mac Anna; a one-woman show in which she also starred), and Or By Appointment (1986).

Cluskey was also known for the roles she played in films, including Young Cassidy (1965), Ulysses (1967), and The Purple Taxi (1977). On television she played Queenie Butler in the Irish soap opera Tolka Row, for which she won a Jacob's Award in 1966.

Personal life 
Cluskey died in Dublin in 1991, days before her 64th birthday.

Filmography

References

External links 

 A photograph of May Cluskey in a scene from Strindberg's Miss Julie (1963), by Roy Bedell, in the RTÉ Archives.
A photograph of May Clusky (1973), by Ronan Lee, in the RTÉ Archives.
Sam (May 12, 2018), "Anti-Amendment Music (1982-83)", Come Here to Me!, a blogpost including a photograph of May Cluskey with other performers, from a 1983 newspaper. 

; her grave is in Glasnevin Cemetery.

1927 births
1991 deaths
Irish stage actresses
Jacob's Award winners
Actresses from Dublin (city)
Irish film actresses
Irish television actresses